The Place du Luxembourg (French) or Luxemburgplein (Dutch), meaning "Luxembourg Square", is a square in the European Quarter of Brussels, Belgium. It is better known by local European bureaucrats and journalists by one of its nicknames, Place Lux or Plux.

The square is mostly located in the City of Brussels with a small part in the municipality of Ixelles, between the / and the /. In its centre stands statue of John Cockerill. It is also flanked by the European Parliament, as well as some of the main European Institutions in the city. It is served by Brussels-Luxembourg railway station.

History

Early history
The / was a central feature of the Leopold Quarter, a neighbourhood developed in the first few decades after the Belgian Revolution, and the most prestigious residential area in the capital for the bulk of the 19th century. The district had been designed in 1838 by the architect Tilman-Francois Suys, but the original design did not include provisions for a train station.

When the new Leopold Quarter railway station was built in 1854–55, the architect  was commissioned to draw up plans for a large public square leading to the station. The / was then in an embryonic state, and the square was created as its end point. The square was designed in a neoclassical style and to be as symmetrical as possible. Construction was carried out primarily between 1855 and 1861. The square was popular among merchants, as well as restaurant and café owners, due to its proximity to the station. One house on the corner of the / was, at one time, the home of Auguste Beernaert, Prime Minister from 1884 to 1894.

During the 19th century, the station was divided into sections to differentiate the three different classes of travel. The station was extended in 1899 and 1921 with single storey pavilions, which were then amalgamated in 1934, when the facade was standardised.

1980s to present

The station was the central feature of the square for much of its existence. However, with the construction of the Espace Léopold (which now houses the European Parliament) starting in 1989, the character of the square changed significantly. Designs changed frequently, amidst much legal and political wrangling, but ultimately the tracks of the previously open air station were covered over by the flagstone mall that is now seen outside the parliament. The bulk of the station building itself was torn down in 2004, and rebuilt underground, leaving only the central entrance which now serves as an information office. By 2008, the European Parliament complex was complete.

Residents' associations and cultural heritage promoters have been critical of many aspects of the construction of the Parliament and redesign of the train station. Some believe that the scale of the complex is simply too large for the area, and that efforts have not been adequate to integrate it with its largely neoclassical surroundings. While many have praised the originality and professionalism of the design of the buildings, the design has also faced criticism for being too large, cold, and remote.

In recent years, the Place du Luxembourg has become a hotspot for after-work nightlife activity in the European Quarter, primarily on Thursday and Friday nights. The square is colloquially known as Place Lux or Plux by local European bureaucrats and journalists. The trash left on the square by the Thursday night revellers has become an irritant for local residents, and Brussels politicians have threatened to shut down the party.

Layout

The Place du Luxembourg largely consists of restaurants and bars which dominate the wide pavements, with some banks and other retail services, serving the civil servants and members of the neighbouring European Parliament, as well as the other European Institutions and associated organisations which are mostly located close by.

In the centre of the square is a statue of John Cockerill, a prominent British-Belgian 19th-century industrialist, which is a copy of the statue outside Seraing's Town Hall in Liège Province (Wallonia). The figure of Cockerill is leaning against an anvil and surrounded by an industrial figures from period: a glassmaker, a mechanic, a puddler and a miner. Cockerill's motto, Work and Intelligence, are engraved upon the statue.

Directly behind the statue on the eastern side of the square is the square's principle structure. The former entrance to Leopold Quarter railway station (now the subterranean Brussels-Luxembourg railway station with its entrance moved east) is a listed building and was taken over by the European Parliament and Belgian authorities as a joint information office and museum. It now houses the "infopoint" of the Parliament.

The building forms part of Parliament's Espace Léopold (the complex of Parliamentary buildings in Brussels) along with two new buildings either side which border the square. The whole complex of Parliamentary buildings dominate the eastern view of the square, with the dome of Parliament's Paul-Henri Spaak building mirroring the clock at the top of the station facade, creating a popular shot of Parliament from the square. Openings each side of the old station building lead directly to the Esplanade of the European Parliament, the pedestrian mall running the length of the Parliament.

Map of the square

Future
In plans to rebuild parts of the European Quarter, the Place du Luxembourg would become one of three main pedestrian squares, each focusing on a different theme. Due to its proximity to the European Parliament, the Place du Luxembourg would focus on citizens. Also planned is the potential clearing of space between the / and the / for a new square, possibly as a long extension of the Place du Luxembourg creating a vast boulevard-like public space. The Brussels transportation authority, STIB/MIVB, has provisional plans to build a metro extension with a stop on the square at Brussels-Luxembourg railway station. In 2011, plans were announced in partnership between the municipality of Ixelles and the Parliament to try to reduce the "mess" left by revellers on busy nights, which the local authority deemed to be "totally unacceptable."

See also

 Neoclassical architecture in Belgium
 History of Brussels
 Belgium in "the long nineteenth century"

References

Notes

Squares in Brussels
City of Brussels
European quarter of Brussels